St Andrew's Church is a Church of England parish church located in the village of Mells in the English county of Somerset. The church is a grade I listed building.

History

The current church predominantly dates from the late 15th century and was built in the Perpendicular style with mid 19th century restoration, although a previous church stood on the site for centuries. In 1292 it belonged to Glastonbury Abbey and was valued at 35 marks.

The tower is from 1446, has a clock from the 17th century and a ring of 8 bells hung for change ringing, the earliest of which dates from 1716.  That bell, the fourth of the ring, and the seventh (1717) were cast by the first Abraham Rudhall of the bellfounders Rudhall of Gloucester.  Two more (the third and eighth) were cast in 1745 by Thomas Bilbie, and the sixth (1788) by William Bilbie of the Bilbie family of bellfounders.  The other three bells, (the first, second and fifth) were cast in 1869 by Mears & Stainbank of the Whitechapel Bell Foundry. There is also a sanctus bell hung in the roof of the chancel which dates from around 1325 which is on the national database of historically important bells.

The church has close connections with the local Asquith family and the Horners who lived at Mells Manor.

Notable burials

Siegfried Sassoon
Ronald Knox
Sir Maurice Bonham Carter
Violet Bonham Carter, Baroness Asquith
George A. Birmingham aka James Owen Hannay
Christopher Hollis
Katharine Asquith, widow of Raymond Asquith
Reginald McKenna (in the McKenna family grave)
Lt. Col. Simon Fordham OBE

Features

The interior includes a reredos made from white marble, and a marble altar in various colours with a Norman font. There are also several stained glass windows dating from around 1850.

Other notable features and fittings include:
 a stained-glass window by William Nicholson
 a white gesso plaque of 1886 by Edward Burne-Jones to Laura Lyttelton. (Burne-Jones created a gilded copy of the memorial now in the Victoria and Albert Museum.)
 a tapestry after Burne-Jones by Lady Horner
 a stone tablet listing the names of the village's dead from the two world wars
 a bronze wreath designed by Sir Edwin Lutyens, with lettering by Eric Gill, to Raymond Asquith (Lutyens also designed Mells War Memorial) and
 an equestrian statue of Edward Horner by Sir Alfred Munnings (on a base by Lutyens): Horner fell at the Battle of Cambrai in 1917. The quality of the statue led to a commission from the Jockey Club for Munnings to create a bronze of the racehorse Brown Jack.
a bronze plaque to Captain Stanes Geoffrey Bates of the 7th Queen's Own Hussars, killed in action near Ypres in the First World War

Organ

The church has a two manual pipe organ dating from 1880 by Vowles. A specification of the organ can be found on the National Pipe Organ Register.

Gallery

See also
 List of ecclesiastical parishes in the Diocese of Bath and Wells

References

Mells
Mells, St Andrew's Church
Grade I listed buildings in Mendip District
Mells, Somerset